Amok is the first full-length album by Elephant Six musician The Late B.P. Helium.  It was released in 2004 on Orange Twin Records.

Track listing
All tracks by Bryan Poole, except where noted.

"Belief System Derailment Scenario" - 4:20
"Bluebeard" (Bryan Poole, Taylor Davis, Aaron Wegelin) - 2:00
"The Ballad of Johnny Rad" - 2:16
"Rabbit's Ear" - 3:23
"They Broke the Speed of Light" - 6:35
"Emperor's Drone" - 3:22
"Candy for Everyone" - 3:40
"Curse of the Trial" - 3:10
"I Tried to Make It with You" - 3:16
"Reminder to Self" - 2:50
"Raisa Raisa" - 5:04

References

2004 albums
The Late B.P. Helium albums